Cullingford Field  was an airstrip owned and operated by the United States Fish and Wildlife Service near Boquerón in the municipality of Cabo Rojo, Puerto Rico. Located within the Cabo Rojo National Wildlife Refuge, it was used exclusively by Fish and Wildlife personnel.

Google Earth Historical Imagery (3/27/2004) shows an east-west  grass runway with a Quonset hangar midfield. The (10/31/2006) image shows the runway area divided into unfenced plots and being cultivated. By 2009 the runway had been returned to grass and usability. The (10/24/2010) image shows the runway usable, but the hangar being demolished. By (12/3/2011) the hangar is gone and brush is growing on the runway. Current imagery (11/29/2017) shows the airfield returned to nature.

See also

Transport in Puerto Rico
List of airports in Puerto Rico

References

External links
OpenStreetMap - Cullingford Field

Defunct airports in Puerto Rico
Airports in Puerto Rico
Cabo Rojo, Puerto Rico